Angali Rural District (Angāli) is in the Central District of Bushehr County, Bushehr province, Iran. At the census of 2006, its population was 2,636 in 557 households; there were 2,301 inhabitants in 601 households at the following census of 2011; and in the most recent census of 2016, the population of the rural district was 2,209 in 653 households. The largest of its 25 villages was Koreh Band, with 1,203 people.

The district is located near the coast of the Persian Gulf, some fifty-five kilometers to the north of the city of Būshehr, the capital city of the Būshehr province, at the southwest of Iran.  It is enclosed between the Rūhelle River (= local for rūd helle, "Hellé River") and the Shabānkāre district on the north, the Rūhelle district on the west, the Būshehr harbor on the south, and the Dashtestān District to the east.

At one time it was under the jurisdiction of the governor of the Persian Gulf Ports.  In conjunction with Būshehr, this province was later developed into the province of “Būshehr and Banāder” (‘Bushehr and the ports’).  Angāli was formerly a part of the Dashtestān province and later it was separated for administrative purposes.
Although historically Angāli has always been one of the important and strategic centers of political activity (partly due to the conflict between the local khāns [‘chieftains’] and the central government, over matters such as independence and fire arms control, etc.), Angāli was never registered on maps of Iran. Even in the most current maps only occasionally it is included. One of the main reasons is rooted in the strategy of the Pahlavi regime (under Reza Shah, as well as his son and successor Mohammad-Reza, a.k.a. the Shah) who kept the regional powers (that is, the khāns, kalāntars, and their tribes and tribesmen) in low profile, in order to prevent any possible encouragement for others, who might follow their foot steps in dealing with the central government.  In fact, Lorimer attests that, “the men of Angāli are described as brave and hard working.”  It is not infrequent in the history of Iran that the central governments fear these “brave and hard working” local men.

Religion.  Angāli people are Shi’ite Muslims, believing in the twelve Imams.  They are faithful believers, and, except for children and some of the youth before the legal age of eighteen, they all observe their religious rituals——three times of prayers during the day, annual fasting, etc.

Among the main villages are:

Askərī

Bin Həmād  	entirely destroyed.

Fərāke:

Hafjūš (< * haft).

Hamūd (Bin Həmād and Hamūd tell us that some populations of Arab origin resided in these villages).

Hapolū (also known as Xašem Barxorδ̣ār)	completely destroyed (there are only a mound and a nubk-tree left).

Hasan Neδ̣ū (< * nezūm <  nezām).

Heyδ̣ərī

Xəšem Ka:lsn (< * Karbalāyi-Hassan).

Xəšem Šālī (< * ahšām šāh alī).

Xəšem Šeyxī

Zarδ̣əkī, the Lower.

Zarδ̣əkī, the Upper.

Zendn (< * zendān).

Kórevand (< * korre band).

Mo:rezī (< mohrazī).

Momšeyī (< Mohammad-šāhī).

Nōdərār	completely destroyed.

Nūkāl-e Gəzī (< * nowkār-e gazī < gaz 'tamarisk').

Nūkāl-e Moxī (< mox 'palm tree').

Qa:le Soxte: (< qal`e-ye sūxté 'the burnt fortification').

Rəsa:mī (< * rostamī).

Seylī (< * soheylī).

Tolveī͜ (< tol 'mound,' + behī 'Zoroastrian; suggesting that at one time a village belonged to the followers of the "Good Fate.").

Xəšem Ka:l Morāδ̣

References 

Rural Districts of Bushehr Province
Populated places in Bushehr County